is a Japanese manga series written and illustrated by Takashi Hashiguchi. It was serialized in Shogakukan's Weekly Shōnen Sunday from December 2001 to January 2007, with its chapters collected in 26 tankōbon volumes. A 69-episode anime television series adaptation by Sunrise was broadcast on TV Tokyo from October 2004 to March 2006. In North America, the manga was licensed in English by Viz Media in 2005 and Nozomi Entertainment licensed the anime series in 2014.

In 2004, Yakitate!! Japan won the 49th Shogakukan Manga Award for the shōnen category.

Plot

Kazuma Azuma is a boy on a quest to create "Ja-pan", a national bread for Japan, as many other countries have their own signature breads. He heads to Tokyo with the intention of working at the famous bread-making chain Pantasia. Along the way, he meets other bakers, both learning from and competing against them. The characters bake their bread using their burning passion and even anger, similar to the legendary  cooking style of Hokkaido. Besides a desire to create Ja-pan, Azuma also possesses legendary : hands that are warmer than typical, prompting dough to ferment faster. While this gives him an advantage early on, his innovation is his greater talent.

Media

Manga
Written and illustrated by Takashi Hashiguchi, Yakitate!! Japan was serialized in Shogakukan's Weekly Shōnen Sunday from December 26, 2001, to January 10, 2007. Shogakukan collected its chapters into twenty-six tankōbon volumes, published from March 18, 2002, to April 18, 2007.

In North America, Viz Media licensed the manga in late 2005. The twenty-six volumes were released from September 12, 2006, to April 12, 2011.

Hashiguchi began a new series titled , serialized on LINE Manga app since August 16, 2019. The manga is written by Kenzo Irie and illustrated by Hashiguchi. Its chapters were collected in five tankōbon volumes, released from April 17, 2020, to December 17, 2021.

Volume list

Yakitate!! Japan

Yakitate!! Japan Super Real

Anime

Yakitate!! Japan was adapted into a 69-episode anime television series. It aired on TV Tokyo from October 12, 2004, to March 14, 2006. Aniplex collected the individual episodes on DVD. The first arc, Pantasia Newcomers Battle arc, was compiled on seven DVDs released from March 25 to September 28, 2005. The second arc, Monaco Cup arc was compiled on six DVDs released from October 26, 2005, to March 29, 2006. The third arc, Yakitate! 9 arc, was released on five DVDs from April 26 to August 23, 2006.

In North America, the series was licensed by Nozomi Entertainment in July 2014. Nozomi released the series on three DVD sets on March 3, May 5, and July 7, 2015. Crunchyroll started streaming the series in November 2015. In July 2019, Funimation announced the streaming rights to the series on its FunimationNow platform.

Music
The music from the anime series was composed by Taku Iwasaki. Two original soundtracks albums were released on March 24 and November 23, 2005.

The second opening theme for episodes 30 to 53 is "Promise" by TiA.

The first ending theme for episodes 1 to 12 is "Sunday" by The Babystars. The second ending theme for episodes 13 to 29 is "To All Tha Dreamers" by Soul'd Out. The fourth ending theme for episodes 43 to 53 is "Re: START" by Surface. The fifth ending theme for episodes 54 to 62 is "Merry Go Round" by Mai Hoshimura. The first opening theme "Houki Gumo" is used as the final ending theme for episode 69.

Video games
A video game, titled , published by Bandai, was released for the Nintendo DS on January 12, 2006. Characters also appeared in the crossover , also for Nintendo DS in 2009.

Reception
Along with Fullmetal Alchemist, Yakitate!! Japan won the 49th Shogakukan Manga Award for the shōnen category in 2004.

See also
Chūka Ichiban! (1995 debut), a cooking manga and anime series
The God of Cookery (1996), a Stephen Chow cooking film
Food Wars! Shokugeki no Soma (2012 debut), a cooking manga and anime series

Notes

References

External links
  
  
  
 

2001 manga
2004 anime television series debuts
Aniplex
Comedy anime and manga
Cooking in anime and manga
Muse Communication
Shogakukan manga
Shōnen manga
Sunrise (company)
TV Tokyo original programming
Viz Media manga
Winners of the Shogakukan Manga Award for shōnen manga